Spaulding Pond is a pond 0.3 nautical miles (0.003 km) northeast of the terminal ice cliff of Howard Glacier in Taylor Valley, Victoria Land. The name was suggested by Diane McKnight, leader of United States Geological Survey (USGS) field teams which studied the hydrology, meteorology and geochemistry of streams and ponds in the Lake Fryxell basin, Taylor Valley, 1987–94. Named after USGS hydrologist Sarah Ann Spaulding, a member of the team during two seasons, 1988–89 and 1991–92, who studied the pond.

Lakes of Victoria Land
McMurdo Dry Valleys